Rudolf Lourens "Ruud" Vreeman (born 31 December 1947) is a Dutch politician of the Labour Party (PvdA) and trade union leader.

Decorations

References

External links

Official
  Dr. R.L. (Ruud) Vreeman Parlement & Politiek
  Dr. R.L. Vreeman (PvdA) Eerste Kamer der Staten-Generaal

 

 

1947 births
Living people
Chairmen of the Labour Party (Netherlands)
Delft University of Technology alumni
Dutch corporate directors
Dutch education writers
Dutch field hockey coaches
Dutch political writers
Dutch sportsperson-politicians
Dutch sportswriters
Dutch male field hockey players
Dutch nonprofit directors
Dutch nonprofit executives
Dutch trade union leaders
Dutch public broadcasting administrators
Dutch sports executives and administrators
Labour Party (Netherlands) politicians
Mayors of Groningen
Mayors in North Brabant
People from Tilburg
Mayors of Zaanstad
Members of the House of Representatives (Netherlands)
Members of the Senate (Netherlands)
Officers of the Order of Orange-Nassau
People from Zaanstad
People from Zwolle
University of Groningen alumni
Writers about activism and social change
20th-century Dutch businesspeople
20th-century Dutch male writers
20th-century Dutch politicians
21st-century Dutch businesspeople
21st-century Dutch male writers
21st-century Dutch politicians